The Cranbrook Memorial Arena is a 1,704-seat (ice in) and 2,451-seat (ice out) multi-purpose arena in Cranbrook, British Columbia, Canada. It was briefly home to the Kootenay Ice while the Cranbrook RecPlex was under construction.

Sports venues in British Columbia
Indoor arenas in British Columbia
Indoor ice hockey venues in British Columbia
Western Hockey League arenas
Cranbrook, British Columbia